The 1968 Season was the 9th season for the San Diego Chargers as a professional AFL franchise; the team improved on their 8–5–1 record from 1967, finishing at 9–5.

Draft

Roster

Season schedule

Game summaries

Week 13: at Denver Broncos

Standings

References

San Diego Chargers
San Diego Chargers seasons
San Diego Chargers f